Lucius Postumius Megellus (c. 300 BC – 253 BC) was a politician and general during the middle years of the Roman Republic. He was elected consul in 262 BC, and fought during the early years of the First Punic War.

Career
A member of the patrician Postumia clan, Megellus was the son of Lucius Postumius Megellus, who had been consul three times between 305 BC and 291 BC. The younger Megellus was elected Roman consul in his turn in 262 BC, during the third year of the First Punic War, alongside Quintus Mamilius Vitulus. After taking office at the beginning of May 262 BC, both consuls were dispatched within a few weeks of taking office to Sicily in response to a Carthaginian military build-up, which saw Carthage turn the town of Agrigentum into their principal base on the southern coast of Sicily. After possibly campaigning in western Sicily for a brief time they then spent the remainder of their consulate besieging and finally capturing the town of Agrigentum. 

There is one anecdote of this lengthy campaign, ascribed by Frontinus to Megellus, where the consul noted a strategic weakness in the regular Carthaginian sorties, and was able to get around the attacking Carthaginian forces to attack them from the rear and completely rout the tired and hungry Carthaginians when they attempted to retreat to the town. Although the capture of the town was an important victory for Rome, neither consul was awarded a Triumph for their successful actions.

In 253 BC, Megellus had the unusual distinction of being elected both to the office of Praetor and Censor in the same year. During his time in occupying these offices, Megellus died.

Sources
 Broughton, T. Robert S., The Magistrates of the Roman Republic, Vol I (1951)
 Lazenby, John Francis, The First Punic War: A Military History (1996)
 Smith, William, Dictionary of Greek and Roman Biography and Mythology, Vol II (1867).

Footnotes

References

3rd-century BC Roman consuls
Megellus, Lucius
Ancient Roman generals
300s BC births
253 BC deaths
Year of birth uncertain